The 1930 Oklahoma City Goldbugs football team was an American football team that represented Oklahoma City University during the 1930 college football season as a member of the Big Four Conference. In Vee Green's third season as head coach, the team compiled a 9–1 record.

Schedule

References

Oklahoma City
Oklahoma City Chiefs football seasons
Oklahoma City Goldbugs football